Guzmania longibracteata is a species of plant in the genus Guzmania. It is a member of the family Bromeliaceae.

References

longibracteata